Singapore competed at the 2014 Summer Youth Olympics, in Nanjing, China from 16 August to 28 August 2014.

Singapore won its first ever gold medal in the youth olympics at this edition of the Youth Olympic Games.

Medalists
Medals awarded to participants of mixed-NOC (Combined) teams are represented in italics. These medals are not counted towards the individual NOC medal tally.

Singapore medalists:

Athletics

Singapore qualified one athlete.

Qualification Legend: Q=Final A (medal); qB=Final B (non-medal); qC=Final C (non-medal); qD=Final D (non-medal); qE=Final E (non-medal)

Girls
Track & road events

Badminton

Singapore qualified two athletes based on the 2 May 2014 BWF Junior World Rankings.

Singles

Doubles

Diving

Singapore qualified one quota based on its performance at the Nanjing 2014 Diving Qualifying Event.

Gymnastics

Artistic Gymnastics

Singapore qualified one athlete based on its performance at the 2014 Asian Artistic Gymnastics Championships.

Girls

Sailing

Singapore qualified two Byte CII boats based on its performance at the 2013 World Byte CII Championships. Singapore also qualified a Techno 293 boat from its performance at the Techno 293 Asian Continental Qualifiers.

Shooting

Singapore qualified two shooters based on its performance at the 2014 Asian Shooting Championships.

Individual

Team

Swimming

Singapore qualified four swimmers.

Boys

Girls

Mixed

Table Tennis

Singapore qualified two athletes based on its performance at the Asian Qualification Event.

Singles

Team

Qualification Legend: Q=Main Bracket (medal); qB=Consolation Bracket (non-medal)

Triathlon

Singapore qualified two athletes based on its performance at the 2014 Asian Youth Olympic Games Qualifier.

Individual

Relay

References

2014 in Singaporean sport
Nations at the 2014 Summer Youth Olympics
Singapore at the Youth Olympics